Herzwerk II ("Heart-work II") is the fourth studio album by German industrial metal band Megaherz. It is the last album to feature singer Alexx Wesselsky before he left with Noel Pix to form Eisbrecher. The final track, "Es brennt" ("It Burns"), which talks about the differences between Eastern and Western Germany, was included on the digipak version of the disc. The album was re-released in the United States in 2008, with "Es brennt" included.

Track listing 
 "Herzblut" ("Heart-blood") - 5:18
 "Glas und Tränen" ("Glass and Tears") - 3:55
 "I.M. Rumpelstilzchen" (Unofficial collaborator Rumplestiltskin) - 4:31
 "5. März" ("March 5th") - 4:17
 "F.F.F. (Flesh for Fantasy)" - 5:25 (Billy Idol cover)
 "Hand auf's Herz" ("Hand on My Heart") - 3:59
 "Zu den Sternen" ("To the Stars") - 5:14
 "Licht II (Instrumental)" ("Light II") - 2:08
 "Heute schon gelebt?" ("Lived Yet Today?") - 3:51
 "An deinem Grab" ("At Your Grave") - 6:57
 "Perfekte Droge" ("Perfect Drug") - 4:27
 "Spiel' nicht…" ("Don't Play…") - 4:41
 "Gold" - 5:11
 "Es brennt" ("It Burns") - 4:03

 "Herzblut" is a German compound word literally meaning "heart-blood" or "blood of the heart". The official translation suggests that "a better translation would be 'your everything and all, your essence'."

Personnel 
 Alexander Wesselsky – lead vocals
 Christian "X-ti" Bystron – guitar
 Wenz – bass
 Oliver Pohl – guitar
 Jürgen Schlachter – drums
 Ralf Weigand – keyboards, percussion
 Corni Bartels – drums on "Hand auf's Herz"
 Nicki Schuster, Claudia Rossler, Voodoo Man – backing vocals

Charts

References

External links
 Megaherz official site

Megaherz albums
2002 albums